The Yakutian Laika is an ancient working dog breed that originated in the Arctic seashore of the Sakha (Yakutia) Republic. Yakutian Laikas are multipurpose laikas, with many lineages able to herd reindeer, hunt game and/or pull a sled. They are registered with the Russian Kennel Club, the FCI and the AKC's Foundation Stock Service in 2017.

History 
Yakutian Laikas are a breed with ancient origins developed by native Yakuts for hunting mammals and birds, herding livestock and hauling game back to camp. The dogs were indispensable assistants and companions. In the Sakha language, this breed is known as "Sakha yta" meaning "Yakut dog". Evidence of this breed can be found in archaeological remains dating 12,500 years ago. Remnants of dog sleds and harnesses has been found with dog remains in the Sakha republic radiocarbon dated to 7800–8000 years ago.

The earliest known written mention of the Yakutian Laika is the Kungur Chronicle and the Remezov Chronicle, created at the end of the 16th century and 1703 respectively. In these historical records, people are described living along Siberian rivers, whose primary means of transport was either reindeer or dogs. In these documents, the rivers Olenyok, Yana, Indigirka and Kolyma were called “dog rivers”, as they were rich in fish for the dogs to eat. Rivers where there is no fish or it is not enough to feed the dogs, reindeer are used for transportation, and such rivers were called "deer rivers."

With the increased demand for white polar foxes in the 17th century, Arctic exploration received its spike. Furs and mammoth tusks trade became local nations’ main income. Because of the difficulty accessing Yakutia and extreme natural conditions, Yakutian Laikas continued to live as primitive aboriginal breeds; they were rarely confined and mated freely. Naturally, local type dogs could be preserved only under conditions of complete isolation from dogs of other breeds.

First scientific descriptions of dogs of Yakutia were published in late 18th century, when geographic studies of the north were conducted by Prince Shirinsky-Shikhmatov.  He wrote in his monograph about Laikas: “Researchers of the north, of course, could not overlook northern dog; they could not disagree with hard fact that presence of this dog makes life of northern people possible.  In 1896, Vlatslav  Seroshevsky published the book “Yakuts.” Seroshevsky divides them into two groups, 1) guarding and hunting dogs and 2) maritime sled dogs. He wrote: “even most poor Yakut having no other animals, has at least one dog”.

Russian ethnographer Vladimir Jochelson in his 1898 publication “Hunting Industry in Kolyma Territory of Yakutian Province” described the laika used for sledding and hunting dogs, saying, “There are two breeds of dogs, one is so-called Tungus Laika, a pointed-eared dog of nomadic reindeer herders and polar sled dog.  Sled dog is a burden animal not only of nomads living in not forested country, but also of settled near the river Russians and russified minorities and the dog of majority of cattle keeping Yakuts. Except southwestern part of the territory, one can find 5-6 dogs in every yurta, which are used for hauling firewood and other works needed by the household. The polar dog is not big, 50-60 cm at the shoulder… In the appearance, with his prick ears, oblique set eyes, thick coat and broad massive head, pointed muzzle, low carried tail (when the dog is tired, eats or in a bad mood), the dog is very similar to wolf. Among them, there are shaggy dogs, and somewhat blunt muzzle not different from our Spitzes … Generally, type of Kolyma sled dog is diverse and, perhaps, it is a mix between Kamchatka and Eskimo sled dogs with another imported breed.”From the 1940s to the 1990s, Yakutian Laika numbers were in decline. Breed population reached an all-time low of 3000 in 1998 before revival efforts took off.,  Reasons for their decline include: 
 introduction of mechanization in the Arctic
 reduced capacity to keep dogs, especially with reduced fish catches and collectivization of farming and reindeer herding.
decline of fur hunting.
introduction of disease.

Characteristics

This is a versatile dog with excellent sense of smell, hearing and vision, strong hunting drive, endurance; they are aggressive to predators and soft and gentle to humans if properly socialized from young age. Whereas most aboriginal laika breeds are predominantly hunting dogs, the Yakutian Laika is predominantly a sled dog who also retain rudimentary hunting and herding abilities. However, due to the vastness of Yakutia, Yakutian Laika can specialized to fulfill the needs of different regions, and there are an estimated 200 who are exclusively hunting dogs.  Yakutian Laikas are tolerant regarding living conditions and easily endure the hostile climate of northern Siberia, even when left to fend for themselves. In harsh Siberian conditions they reveal their stamina; they tend to work in small groups and can work through the whole day, from dawn to sunset. The breed thrives on regular exercise and sufficient training. They play well with other dogs they are familiar with, but are wary of strange dogs and people. Usually, they warm up quickly, but supervision is a good idea in new situations. Yakutian Laikas are not suitable for people who cannot spend time with their dogs. Since this breed has a high prey drive, they are not ideal for homes with cats or other smaller animals.

Cloning 
Two Yakutian Hunting Laika were cloned in 2017 in an effort to preserve the critical endangered hunting Yakutian laika. In 2020, one of the cloned dogs successfully whelped a litter of 7 puppies.
The Yakutian hunting Laika and the Yakutian Laika are thought to be two different breeds.

See also
 Yakuts
 Yakutian horse
 Yakutian cattle

References

FCI breeds
Dog breeds originating in Russia
laika
Spitz breeds